Mark Robert Worrell (born March 8, 1983) is an American former Major League Baseball pitcher who played for the St. Louis Cardinals and the Baltimore Orioles between 2008 and 2011.

Amateur career
A native of Palm Beach Gardens, Florida, Worrell attended John I. Leonard Community High School. He played college baseball at the University of Arizona and Florida International University. In 2003, he played collegiate summer baseball with the Cotuit Kettleers of the Cape Cod Baseball League. He was selected by the St. Louis Cardinals in the 12th round of the 2004 MLB Draft.

Professional career
Worrell was called up to the major leagues by the Cardinals on June 1, 2008, and made his debut on June 3. On June 5, Worrell hit a three-run home run in his first major league at-bat.

On December 4, 2008, Worrell was traded to the San Diego Padres for shortstop Khalil Greene. After missing the entire season while recovering from Tommy John surgery, Worrell was non-tendered on December 12, 2009.

On January 7, 2010, Worrell signed a minor league contract to return to the San Diego Padres. After appearing in 25 games with the Portland Beavers, he was released on June 23. On July 1, Worrell signed a minor league contract with the Seattle Mariners, but was subsequently released on July 14 after pitching in just four games for the Tacoma Rainiers.

On February 1, 2011, Worrell signed a minor league contract with the Baltimore Orioles, and started the season with the Norfolk Tides. He was called up by Baltimore on July 17 and appeared in four games, giving up eight runs in two innings, including Mike Trout's first career home run, before returning to Norfolk. He became a free agent after the season.

See also
List of players with a home run in first major league at-bat

References

External links

13 January 2006 1:25 PM ET. Worrell making strides in winter ball. Familiar name in Cardinals history has organization's attention. By Matthew Leach
Worrell player profile at Scout.com

1983 births
Living people
American expatriate baseball players in Mexico
Arizona Wildcats baseball players
Baltimore Orioles players
Baseball players from Florida
Cotuit Kettleers players
Diablos Rojos del México players
FIU Panthers baseball players
Indian River State Pioneers baseball players
Johnson City Cardinals players
Major League Baseball pitchers
Memphis Redbirds players
Mexican League baseball pitchers
Norfolk Tides players
Palm Beach Cardinals players
Peoria Chiefs players
Portland Beavers players
St. Louis Cardinals players
Springfield Cardinals players
Tacoma Rainiers players